The 2010–11 United Counties League season was the 104th in the history of the United Counties League, a football competition in England.

Premier Division

The Premier Division featured 18 clubs which competed in the division last season, along with three new clubs:
Irchester United, promoted from Division One
King's Lynn Town, new club formed after King's Lynn folded
Peterborough Northern Star, promoted from Division One

League table

Division One

Division One featured 14 clubs which competed in the division last season, along with three new clubs:
Bourne Town, demoted from the Premier Division
Harborough Town, joined from the Northamptonshire Combination League
Rothwell Town, resigned from the Southern Football League

League table

References

External links
 United Counties League

9
United Counties League seasons